"The World Is Stone" is a song by American singer Cyndi Lauper. This English version is based on the French song "Le Monde est stone" (1978), which was part of the Starmania musical and has been most notably associated with Fabienne Thibeault, Marie Carmen, Céline Dion, and Maurane. The song was composed by Michel Berger. The original French lyrics were written by Luc Plamondon, and the English lyrics were written by Tim Rice.

Although this single was not released in United States, it was a hit in several European countries, especially in France, where it reached number two, stayed in the top five for three months, and totaled 31 weeks in the top 50. On the single, the B-side is a song entitled "Learn to Live Alone", which was featured on the soundtrack to the English version of Starmania, Tycoon.

Critical reception
Upon its release, Jon Wilde of Melody Maker described "The World Is Stone" as "the kind of muzak ballad that would give seasick a bad name".

Track listings

UK CD1 and Australian CD single
 "The World Is Stone" – 4:24
 "Learn to Live Alone" – 5:08
 "Time After Time" – 3:59

UK CD2
 "The World Is Stone" – 4:24
 "I Drove All Night" – 4:08
 "What's Going On" – 3:51

European 7-inch, CD, and cassette single
 "The World Is Stone" – 4:24
 "Learn to Live Alone" – 5:08

Personnel
Personnel are adapted from the UK CD1 disc notes.
 Michel Berger – writing
 Luc Plamondon – writing
 Tim Rice – writing
 Cyndi Lauper – vocals, production, arrangement
 Peter Wood – arrangement
 Frank Filipetti – mixing
 Guy Gray – recording

Charts

Weekly charts

Year-end charts

References

1978 songs
1992 singles
Celine Dion songs
Cyndi Lauper songs
Epic Records singles
Songs from musicals
Songs with lyrics by Luc Plamondon
Songs with lyrics by Tim Rice
Songs written by Michel Berger